La Silla may refer to:

 La Silla Observatory, an astronomical observatory in Chile 
 Cerro de la Silla,  a mountain and natural monument located within the metropolitan area of the city of Monterrey, Nuevo León, in northeastern Mexico.
 La Silla Awards, the awards granted by the Asociación Dominicana de Profesionales de la Industria del Cine
 2187 La Silla, a stony Eunomia asteroid from the middle region of the asteroid belt